Dansou is a surname. Notable people with the surname include:

 Alois Dansou (born 1982), Beninese swimmer
 Marc Dansou (born 1983), Beninese swimmer